The George Washington University Art Galleries, the Luther W. Brady Art Gallery and the Dimock Gallery, are two university-owned and operated art galleries that showcase the University's permanent art collections, as well as visiting exhibitions. In addition, The George Washington University has a myriad of galleries showcasing student work throughout its buildings and academic/support facilities.  Collections include painting, sculpture, and photographs, ranging from rare historic pieces to Washingtonia and Americana to modern art.

The Dimock Gallery was established in 1966 and relocated and renamed for Susan Dimock Catalini in 2001. The Brady Gallery followed in 2002.

Notable Collections
Henry Bacon, The Boston Boys and General Gage, 1775, Oil on canvas
Gilbert Stuart, George Washington, 1800, Oil on canvas
Rembrandt Peale, Porthole Portrait of George Washington, c. 1820, Oil on canvas

References

Museums of American art
George Washington University buildings and structures
University museums in Washington, D.C.
Art museums and galleries in Washington, D.C.
Foggy Bottom